Sékou Condé (born 9 June 1993) is a Guinean professional footballer who plays as a defender for French Championnat National 2 club Beauvais.

Club career
After playing in the Ukrainian and Israeli football clubs in August 2015, Condé signed a contract with FC Olimpik Donetsk and made his debut in the Ukrainian Premier League in the match against FC Oleksandriya on 15 August 2015.

International career
In September 2015, Condé was called up for the Guinea national football team in the games against Algeria on 9 October and Morocco on 12 October.

Career statistics

Club

International goals
Scores and results list Guinea's goal tally first, score column indicates score after each Condé goal.

Notes

References

External links
 
 

1993 births
Living people
Sportspeople from Conakry
Association football defenders
Guinean footballers
Guinea international footballers
Hakoah Maccabi Amidar Ramat Gan F.C. players
Hapoel Petah Tikva F.C. players
FC Olimpik Donetsk players
FC Amkar Perm players
LB Châteauroux players
AS Beauvais Oise players
Liga Leumit players
Russian Premier League players
Israeli Premier League players
Ukrainian Premier League players
Championnat National players
Championnat National 2 players
Guinean expatriate footballers
Expatriate footballers in Russia
Expatriate footballers in Ukraine
Expatriate footballers in Israel
Expatriate footballers in France
Guinean expatriate sportspeople in Russia
Guinean expatriate sportspeople in Ukraine
Guinean expatriate sportspeople in Israel
Guinean expatriate sportspeople in France